Nugget Creek is fed by the Nugget Glacier, a tributary glacier on the mountainside east of Auke Bay in the borough of Juneau, Alaska, US. The creek feeds Nugget Falls. The rocks of the valley belong to the group of schists which lies next to the main diorite, except at the headwaters, where the edge of the intrusive rock appears.

References

Rivers of Juneau, Alaska
Rivers of Alaska